The Notel(노텔), also called NoteTel (a portmanteau of "notebook" and "television"), is a brand of portable media player made in China which is popular in North Korea. The device has USB and SD ports, can play DVDs and EVDs (enhanced versatile discs, which are physically identical to DVDs but use a different file format), and contains a radio and TV tuner.

Notels have been popular in North Korea since around 2005, significantly facilitating the extension of the "Korean Wave" (Hallyu, the increase of the popularity of South Korean pop culture internationally) into the isolated country. After an earlier crackdown that caused their black market prices to drop, the devices were legalized in December 2014. As of 2015, they are available in some government stores (possession must be registered) as well as selling on the black market for around 300 Chinese yuan (ca. US$50), and are present in up to one in two urban households, according to some estimations. In China, Notels are no longer popular as of 2015 due to the proliferation of smartphones, but sell well in the provinces that border on North Korea.

According to defectors, the Notel's multi-format support is used for evading detection of illegal media consumption: A North Korean DVD can be placed in the device while a South Korean video is played from a USB drive or the SD card, which could be easily removed in case government inspectors arrive and check the device's temperature to see if it has been recently used, leaving the DVD as an alternative explanation.

See also 

Censorship in North Korea
Arirang (smartphone)
Samjiyon tablet computer

References 

Portable media players
Censorship in North Korea
North Korean culture
Chinese brands